Contradusta lapillus is a species of sea snail, a marine gastropod mollusk in the family Cypraeidae.

Original description
 Poppe G.T., Tagaro S.P. & Groh K. (2013) A new species of Contradusta (Gastropoda: Cypraeidae) from the Philippines. Visaya 4(1): 95–101. [February 2013].

References

External links
 Worms Link

Cypraeidae